Haukivuori is a former municipality of Finland located in the province of Eastern Finland and part of the Southern Savonia region. The municipality had a population of 2,361 and covered an area of 505.11 km², of which 108.07 km² is water. The population density was 4.7 inhabitants per km². On 1 January 2007, Haukivuori was incorporated into the city of Mikkeli.

Haukivuori center is c. 41 km by road from Mikkeli center. Kouvola-Iisalmi railway line goes through Haukivuori.

The municipality was unilingually Finnish.

People born in Haukivuori
 Sari Essayah (1967–)

External links

 Haukivuori village

Populated places disestablished in 2007
Former municipalities of Finland
Mikkeli